The Shamkir Hydro Power Plant is one of Azerbaijan's largest hydro power plants having an installed electric capacity of . It is located on Shamkir reservoir in Shamkir Rayon of Azerbaijan, and is owned by Azerenerji.

See also
 List of power stations in Azerbaijan

References

External links

Hydroelectric power stations in Azerbaijan
Hydroelectric power stations built in the Soviet Union